The orangefin madtom (Noturus gilberti) is a species of fish in the family Ictaluridae. It is endemic to the United States, and was originally described from the Roanoke River of Virginia.

References

 Fishbase.org: Noturus gilberti (Orangefin madtom)

Noturus
Madtom
Endemic fauna of the United States
Freshwater fish of the Southeastern United States
Fish described in 1889
Taxa named by David Starr Jordan
Taxonomy articles created by Polbot